Stephen Louis "Steve" Bali is an Australian politician. He has been a Labor member of the New South Wales Legislative Assembly  representing the Electoral District of Blacktown since a by-election held to replace former Labor leader John Robertson in late 2017. He previously served as the Mayor of Blacktown City Council between 2014 and 2019.

Early Life 
Bali was raised in the suburb of Doonside in the heart of Western Sydney by his parents Karoly (Charlie) and Eva Bali, where he still lives today. His father Charlie Bali also served as a councillor and deputy mayor of Blacktown City Council.

Bali graduated with a Bachelor of Business from the Macarthur Institute of Higher Education, a Master of Commerce from the University of Western Sydney, and a Graduate Diploma of Applied Finance from the Finance Institute of Australia.

Between 1996 and 2000 Bali served as an Associate Lecturer at the University of Western Sydney, and from 2000 to 2004 as a Lecturer at the University of Newcastle.

Before entering politics, Bali was an official at the Australian Workers Union from 2004 to 2017.

Political Career 
Stephen Bali was first elected to Blacktown City Council in 2004 representing Ward 4. He served as Deputy Mayor between 2009 and 2010, before being elected as Mayor of the council in 2014 by its fifteen councillors.

In 2016 Mayor Bali was elected as the President of the Western Sydney Regional Organisation of Councils, an organisation of local government areas in Western Sydney including Blacktown City.

On August 8th 2017, the then state member for Blacktown John Robertson announced he would be resigning from the NSW Legislative Assembly, causing a by-election to be held later that year on the 14th of October. Bali, the then high-profile mayor of Blacktown was endorsed as Labor's candidate to succeed the former leader. He was elected as the State Member of Blacktown with 82.3% of the two party preferred vote. In his inaugural speech to the parliament, Bali outlined his goals for health, education, and infrastructure for his electorate, which he claimed had previously been "excluded". Bali was returned to the Legislative Assembly in the 2019 New South Wales State Election with a two party preferred vote of 67.74%, and a swing of +4.55%.

Bali continued to serve as both the Member and Mayor of Blacktown, however, due to legislation introduced by the Liberal O'Farrell State Government in 2012 members of the NSW State Parliament could not hold an office in local government concurrently for more than two years. As a result, Bali resigned as a councillor and Mayor of Blacktown City Council on the 9th of October 2019.

Activism and Charity Work 
In 2015 then Mayor Bali heavily opposed the controversial SBS documentary Struggle Street which depicted what residents called an "unflattering depiction of [Mount Druitt]". In a statement at the time, Bali denounced the documentary as "publically funded poverty porn". After discussions between Blacktown City Council and SBS management deteriorated, Bali commandeered ten council garbage trucks to blockade the Special Broadcaster's headquarters in Artarmon.

Bali also serves as the Chairman of the Better Foundation , a charity created in 2016 which operates in the Blacktown and Mount Druitt area specifically to raise funds for Blacktown Hospital and Mount Druitt Hospital for equipment, training, and other resources that the State Government's budget does not fund.

References

Year of birth missing (living people)
Living people
Shire Presidents and Mayors of Blacktown
Members of the New South Wales Legislative Assembly
Australian Labor Party members of the Parliament of New South Wales
Australian people of Hungarian descent
Australian Labor Party councillors
Deputy mayors of places in Australia
21st-century Australian politicians